Manohar Shankar Hardikar  (8 February 1936 – 4 February 1995) was an Indian Test cricketer.

Hardikar represented India in two Tests against West Indies in 1958/9. He was dismissed by Roy Gilchrist off the very first ball that he faced in Test cricket. He then took a wicket with his third ball in Test cricket by dismissing Rohan Kanhai. In the second innings, he scored 32* and added 85* with G.S. Ramchand which saved India from a possible defeat. In the next Test, Hardikar was hit on the head by a beamer which went for four. He played no more international matches but was involuntarily involved in the controversy that led to the resignation of Polly Umrigar later in the series.

He played for Bombay from 1955/56 to 1967/68. In the Ranji final in his first year, he took a career best 8 for 39 against Bengal. He captained Bombay in twelve matches, winning five and drawing the rest. Bombay won the title in 1965/66 and 1967/68 under his captaincy.

Hardikar died of cancer in 1995.

References

 Obituary in Indian Cricket 1995

1936 births
1995 deaths
Indian cricketers
India Test cricketers
Mumbai cricketers
People from Vadodara
Cricketers from Gujarat